The Partisan Memorial Cemetery in Mostar is located in Mostar, Bosnia and Herzegovina. It was built in 1965 in honor of the Yugoslav Partisans of Mostar who were killed during World War II in Yugoslavia. It's located on Bijeli Brijeg and displays all the features of a complex architectural, aesthetic and landscape design. It is a unique monument in the urban scale of the city of Mostar, and is of particular ambient value.

History
At the initiative of Džemal Bijedić, the Belgrade architect Bogdan Bogdanović was put in charge of the design. The Municipal Assembly passed the decision in 1960 and was carried out by Mostar's Parks and Plantations Corporation. Preparation for the cemetery began in October 1960 and work started on 1 December 1960. Ahmet Ribica, a civil engineer, was in charge of drilling and dynamiting works on the hill and constructing the monument. On 25 September 1965, the 20th anniversary of the liberation of Mostar and the formation of the Mostar Battalion, it was opened by Josip Broz Tito.

In 1992, the cemetery was badly damaged by war and dynamiting. After the war, the cemetery deteriorated due to severe neglect, vandalism and devastation.

On 31 January 2003, a committee composed of Bogdan Bogdanović, Boris Podreka, Amir Pašić, Darko Minarik, Ekrem Krpo, Zdravko Gutić, Tihomir Rozić, Alija Bijavica, Milica Dogan, Florijan Mičković, Milivoj Gagro, Radmilo Andrić, Mumin Isić and Mustafa Selimović was created in support of renovating the cemetery. By the end of 2004 an operational programme of measures was created.

In 2005, works were fixed and various parts of the complex and greenery were reconstructed. On 9 May 2005, the cemetery was formally opened.

In 2006, the cemetery was proclaimed a national monument of Bosnia and Herzegovina. Since then however, the cemetery has once again fallen victim to neglect, heavy vandalism and rubbish dumping. In early 2022, more nationalist graffiti appeared at the cemetery entrance, including swastikas, Ustaše "U"s, and slurs against Bosniaks. On 14 June 2022, most of 700 tombstones were smashed by vandals. In the following week informal groups and individuals started leaving flowers and recovering pieces in symbolic manner.

See also
 Vraca Memorial Park is located in Sarajevo, Bosnia and Herzegovina.
 Partisan cemetery in Livno is located in Livno, Bosnia and Herzegovina.

Notes

References

External links
 
 Spomenik Database – Mostar Partisan Cemetery historic & informational resource

Cemeteries in Bosnia and Herzegovina
World War II cemeteries
Monuments and memorials in Bosnia and Herzegovina
National Monuments of Bosnia and Herzegovina
Buildings and structures in Mostar
1965 establishments in Yugoslavia
Yugoslav World War II monuments and memorials